Jáuregui (from Basque: palace or manor house) may refer to:

Places
 Jáuregui, Buenos Aires, Buenos Aires Province, Argentina
 Jáuregui Municipality, Táchira, Venezuela; see La Grita
 Santa Rosa Jáuregui, Querétaro, Mexico

People with the surname Jáuregui
 Antonio Jauregui, bass player for the Peruvian band Libído
 Carlos Jauregui (chess player) (1932–2013)
 Carlos Jáuregui (activist) (1957–1996)
 César Jáuregui Robles, Mexican lawyer and politician, member of the Federal Judiciary Council
 El Texano (1958–2006), ring name of Mexican professional wrestler Juan Aguilar Jáuregui
 Enrique Urbizu Jáuregui (born 1962), Spanish film director and screenwriter
 Fernando Jáuregui (born 1950), Spanish journalist with the show Mesa de redacción broadcast by Telecinco in Spain
 Hugo Jauregui, head coach of the Argentinian squad for the 2003 FIVB Women's World Cup
 Ignacio Jáuregui (born 1938), player and manager of the Mexican soccer club C.F. Monterrey
 Igor Jauregi (born 1974), Spanish soccer player
 Imanol Jáuregui Tasso, a character in the Mexican telenovela Primer amor... a mil por hora
 Javier Jáuregui (boxer) (1973–2013), Mexican boxer
 Javier Jauregui (footballer) (born 1975), Spanish footballer
 José María Jáuregui (1896–1988), Spanish football goalkeeper
 Julio Jauregui, participant in the debate concerning Irujo's Basque Republic proposal
 Julio Jáuregui, owner of A1 Team Mexico
 Lauren Jauregui (born 1996), American singer and songwriter
 Mario Jáuregui, Mexican footballer; see 1996–97 Atlante F.C. season
 Ramón Jáuregui, leader of the Socialist Party of the Basque Country–Basque Country Left
 Sergio Jáuregui (born 1985), Bolivian soccer defender

People with the surname de Jáuregui
 Agustín de Jáuregui (c. 1711–1784), Spanish politician and soldier who served as governor of Chile and viceroy of Peru
 Gaspar de Jáuregui ('the Shepherd'), Basque guerrilla who became Comandante General of the Basque Provinces; see Tomás de Zumalacárregui
 Heidi Urbahn de Jauregui (born 1940), French academic and essayist, emeritus professor of German Literature
 Juan de Jáuregui (assassin) (1562–1582), failed assassin of Prince William I of Orange
 Juan de Jáuregui (1583–1641), Spanish poet, scholar and painter
 Pablo de Olavide y Jáuregui (1725–1803), Peruvian-born Spanish politician, lawyer and writer

Basque-language surnames